Kings Island is a  amusement park located  northeast of Cincinnati in Mason, Ohio, United States. Owned and operated by Cedar Fair, the park first opened in 1972 by the Taft Broadcasting Company. It was part of a larger effort to move and expand Coney Island, a popular resort destination along the banks of the Ohio River that was prone to frequent flooding. After more than $300 million in capital investments, the park features over 100 attractions including fourteen roller coasters and a  water park.

Early in its history, Kings Island appeared in popular sitcoms and received widespread recognition for its record-breaking attractions and events. One of the park's most well-known attractions, The Racer, is often credited with reviving worldwide interest in roller coasters during the 1970s. The Beast and Banshee are among other attractions that have set world records, some of which are still held today. Kings Island's largest single investment is Orion, a giga coaster that opened in 2020 at a cost of $30 million. The park has also suffered through times of negative publicity, particularly surrounding the early demise of roller coasters The Bat and Son of Beast.

Kings Island is divided into several themed sections and operates seasonally from early spring through the fall, partially reopening for Winterfest during the holiday season. In 2021, Kings Island had an estimated 3.18 million guests, ranking third in attendance among seasonal amusement parks in North America behind sister parks Canada's Wonderland and Cedar Point. In addition, Kings Island has won Golden Ticket Awards from Amusement Today for having the "Best Kids' Area" in the world for eighteen consecutive years (2001–2018) as well as "Best New Ride" in 2017 for Mystic Timbers.

History
Although occasional flooding was common at the successful park, the flood in 1964 was the fourth highest on record and caused considerable damage. Faced with already-limited space for expansion and parking, the event triggered discussions within the organization about relocating the park.

Leading the way was Gary Wachs, son of Coney Island president Ralph Wachs, who with friends and family owned a majority of stock. He decided it was time to relocate the park to stay competitive. After years of research and traveling abroad, he presented ideas for a new theme park to the company's board of directors. Some board members opposed relocating, including significant stockholder Charles Sawyer. It wasn't taken seriously until 1968 when actor Fess Parker announced plans to build a theme park in Northern Kentucky – well within Coney Island's primary market that extended as far south as Louisville. The announcement highlighted the need for change and gave Wachs' proposal credibility within the organization.

Gary and Ralph met with Dudley S. Taft, the president of Taft Broadcasting Company, a business interested in promoting its recently acquired Hanna-Barbera division, to discuss a possible merger. In July 1969, Taft Broadcasting Company purchased Coney Island for $6.5 million and soon after purchased  in Warren County, Ohio, for $3.2 million. Kings Island still owned  of that purchase . The site is located between I-71 and the Little Miami River in what was then a part of Deerfield Township. Following the purchase, Fess Parker's efforts to secure financing fell apart along with his plans to build a competing theme park.

Taft Broadcasting and KECO (1970–1992)
Construction began on June 15, 1970. Later that year, a public contest was held to name the new park. "Kings Island" emerged the most popular for its recognition of the Kings Mills area as well as its predecessor Coney Island. Most of the former park's rides were relocated, and much of what remained was demolished. Coney Island's popular Sunlite Pool attraction continued to operate, however, and the park was partially restored years later.

Less than two years after breaking ground, Kings Island opened its gates to the public on April 29, 1972. It was the first of several preview events. The grand opening was held the following month on May 27, 1972.

One of the first major attractions featured at the park was The Racer, a wooden roller coaster consisting of two trains that race side by side on identical tracks. Designed by legendary designer John C. Allen, who was convinced to come out of retirement, The Racer was the first of its kind in 35 years and played an integral part of the roller coaster renaissance of the 1970s. Decades later, it was distinguished as a Roller Coaster Landmark by American Coaster Enthusiasts (ACE) in recognition for its historical significance. Other roller coasters present on opening day in 1972 were the Bavarian Beetle, a small steel coaster brought over from Coney Island, and a new junior wooden coaster in the Happy Land of Hanna-Barbera originally named Scooby Doo. The most expensive ride to open with the park was Enchanted Voyage, a $2-million dark ride attraction that featured over 100 animatronic Hanna-Barbera characters.

Kings Island was nationally promoted in two well-known sitcoms on ABC. Each filmed an episode on location at the park: The Partridge Family in 1972 and The Brady Bunch in 1973. The Brady Bunch was produced by Paramount Television, a large Taft Broadcasting shareholder. The park also held several world-record-breaking events. The following year, Evel Knievel successfully jumped fourteen Greyhound buses on his Harley Davidson at Kings Island, clearing a distance of  – a record that wasn't broken until 1999. The longest successful jump of his career was also his last major stunt, and the nationally televised event was broadcast live on ABC landing 52 percent of the TV audience for that hour with an estimated 55 million viewers. Park executives favored the national exposure and additional revenue being generated by record-breaking, newsworthy events that kept the park at the forefront of the industry. To keep momentum going, Kings Island spent years researching and designing a mammoth roller coaster, The Beast, which opened in 1979 as the tallest, fastest, and longest wooden roller coaster in the world. It was designed and manufactured internally by the park.

On the heels of early success came turbulent times beginning in the 1980s. Kings Island partnered with Arrow Development, an amusement ride company well known for its work at Disneyland and Disney World, to develop a unique roller coaster concept. The Bat opened to the public in 1981 as the first modern-day, suspended roller coaster featuring an overhead track with train cars that swung freely from side to side, meant to simulate the feeling of flight. Although it was well received by those who rode it, it was plagued with design flaws and constant maintenance that resulted in frequent closures over its short, three-year history. In order to appease frustrated guests, the south track of The Racer began running its trains backward in 1982, which became so popular that the change remained until 2008. The park also pushed forward with its next major addition, King Cobra, which opened in 1984 as the first of its kind to be designed from inception as a stand-up roller coaster.

Kings Island also went through a series of ownership changes over the next decade. Taft sold its theme park division in 1984 for $167.5 million to Kings Entertainment Company (KECO), a company formed by senior executives and general managers of Taft Attractions Group. Three parks – Kings Island, Kings Dominion and Carowinds – were involved in the sale. Taft invested in KECO to retain one-third interest. Three years later in 1987, Kings Island was sold individually to American Financial Corporation, led by Carl Lindner. The deal included a contract with KECO to continue managing park operations. KECO, which retained ownership of the other two parks, also added Great America to its portfolio after purchasing it in 1989 from the city of Santa Clara, California.

Paramount's Kings Island (1992–2006)
In 1992, Paramount Communications Inc. (formerly Gulf+Western) purchased KECO along with Kings Island from American Financial in a deal worth $400 million. Paramount formed a new division known as Paramount Parks. They bought out the remaining 80% stake in Canada's Wonderland in 1993, raising the number of parks to five. That same year, Paramount Parks began incorporating themes from its movies into the park. Viacom entered the picture after acquiring Paramount in 1994, paving the way for the appearance of Nickelodeon themes. First was Nickelodeon Splat City, followed by Nickelodeon Central and eventually Nickelodeon Universe.

In 1997, a year after leaving Deerfield Township, the city of Mason annexed most of Kings Island. A temporary measure allowed for some land to remain in Deerfield in an attempt to appease park officials and reduce the impact on the township. The rest would be annexed in 1999. On June 14, 2005, Viacom announced intentions to split into two companies (Viacom and CBS Corporation) with CBS inheriting Paramount Parks. Seven months later in January 2006, CBS announced intentions to sell its theme park division. CBS CEO Leslie Moonves said that despite the health and profitability of its Paramount Parks business, it was "one that just doesn't fit our core strategy".

Cedar Fair era (2006–present)
After receiving interest from a variety of potential suitors, CBS announced the sale of Paramount Parks to Cedar Fair on June 30, 2006, for approximately $1.24 billion. The acquisition of Kings Island gave Cedar Fair ownership of the last of three major amusement parks in Ohio, alongside Cedar Point and Geauga Lake – the latter was purchased from Six Flags in 2004. Part of the agreement allowed Kings Island to continue using Nickelodeon themes and characters for four years and other Paramount-related branding for ten years, with the option to extend the license on both. Cedar Fair opted for a buyout option within an agreement clause to remove Paramount branding after one season. Beginning in 2008, Face/Off became Invertigo, The Italian Job Stunt Track became Backlot Stunt Coaster, Tomb Raider: The Ride became The Crypt and Top Gun became Flight Deck. Nickelodeon's presence remained until the 2010 season, when Cedar Fair began incorporating its Peanuts theme throughout the park, primarily in the children's area.

In late 2009, the Mason City Council added a measure on its 2010 ballot that would mandate a 3-percent ticket tax and a 5-percent parking tax at both Kings Island and The Beach Waterpark. Council member Tony Bradburn argued that it was necessary for the city to help pay for infrastructure improvements, as well as cover police and fire expenses. The proposed tax hike was the center of debate for several months, as Kings Island actively encouraged the public to write, email, and call Mason City Council representatives to express opposition. On February 8, 2010, Mason City Council voted 5–1 against the measure.

In 2021, Cedar Fair added an outdoor resort and RV campground near the park named Camp Cedar. The year-round campground features 73 cottages, 164 RV lots, and a waterpark. For 2023, Kings Island plans to add a new themed area called Adventure Port, replacing the area once known as Oktoberfest and adding two new family rides – Sol Spin and Cargo Loco.

Areas and attractions

Action Zone
Action Zone opened in 1974 as Lion Country Safari, a  section of the park featuring a monorail ride that took guests on a safari-style tour through an animal preservation. This was part of a network of other safari-style zoos also called Lion Country Safari. It was later renamed Wild Animal Safari in 1977. In 1983, the area became known as Wild Animal Habitat and included Adventure Village, a new area within the rebranded section. Over the years, it featured rides such as Screamin' Demon (1977–1987), the first steel looping roller coaster to run both forward and backward in the United States, and King Cobra (1984–2001), a stand-up looping roller coaster that was the first of its kind in the world.

Early in its tenure after purchasing Kings Island, Paramount unveiled Top Gun, a suspended roller coaster from Arrow Dynamics, in 1993. Located next to the habitat attraction, it was titled after a film of the same name and was the first ride to be added to the park with a Paramount theme. The following year, the entire area was renamed Adventure Village coinciding with the removal of the animal habitat and monorail ride. In 1999, a two-year expansion initiative began with the area's renaming to Action Zone and the addition of two new attractions – Drop Zone: Stunt Tower and Face/Off. When it debuted, Action Zone resembled a movie stunt set featuring a water tower as the centerpiece. The water tower was originally part of a skit with stunts and special effects that imitated a live movie set with a director and stunt performers.

Son of Beast opened in 2000, the second year of the area's two-year expansion. It was the tallest and fastest wooden roller coaster in the world and the first of its kind to feature a vertical loop. As a result of a number of structural issues and two accidents, the ride closed permanently in 2009 and was eventually demolished in 2012. Other notable rides include Delirium, which opened in 2003 as the largest Giant Frisbee ride in the world, and Banshee, the world's longest inverted roller coaster which opened in 2014 at the former location of Son of Beast.

Area 72
Area 72, formerly known as X-Base, is a themed area of Kings Island that debuted in July 2020 with the opening of Orion, a giga coaster that features a  drop. It is described as a "secret research facility that has been studying the effects of flight on man". The area first opened as a small sub-section of Coney Mall when Flight of Fear was introduced in 1996. Following the addition of Firehawk in 2007, the area took on its own theme centered around flight and propulsion, and it was labeled X-Base. The name was only designated by a sign and not labeled on the annual park map.

Firehawk closed in 2018 and was removed prior to the 2019 season. The park leaked clues implying a new ride would take its place, and in August 2019 with park guests and press in attendance, the park unveiled its plans to build Orion. In addition to the new coaster, the park updated the area's theme for the 2020 season, renaming it from X-Base to Area 72 and adding the area to the park map for the first time.

Coney Mall
When Kings Island first opened in 1972, a section of the park was dedicated to its predecessor, Coney Island. The area was constructed to resemble the former park's carnival-style layout and featured many of its flat rides which were relocated, including Monster, Scrambler, and Dodgem. One of the new flagship attractions during the park's inaugural year, The Racer, is located in this section. In addition to rides, some of Coney Island's famous Ginkgo trees were transplanted, lining the middle of the walkway. Originally called Coney Island, the area was renamed Old Coney in 1980 and Coney Mall in 1986. The area also features game booths, arcades, and concession stands in the style of state fairs and traveling carnivals from the early twentieth century.

Zodiac, described as a "spinning, climbing double ferris wheel", debuted in 1975 as one of only two of its kind in the United States. Brokered by Intamin and manufactured by Waagner-Biro, the three-minute ride featured twelve gondolas on each of the two wheels, which were mounted to a long, hydraulic arm. It was removed following the 1986 season and relocated to Wonderland Sydney, where it reopened in 1989. In the 1980s, flat rides Skylab (1986-1997) and Zephyr were added, along with a looping roller coaster named Vortex (1987-2019), which was the first in the world to feature six inversions.

Following Paramount's acquisition of the park in 1992, Coney Mall was further expanded in 1994 with the addition of Days of Thunder, a NASCAR-themed motion simulator ride based on the 1990 film of the same name. The ride was housed within Action Theater located near The Racer's turnaround, and it was later updated with different shows based on James Bond, SpongeBob, and other themes before its closure in 2013. For the 2019 season, an antique car ride called Kings Mill Antique Autos, designed to resemble the retired Les Taxis (1972–2004), returned to Coney Mall as a new attraction.

International Street
At the heart of the amusement park, visitors are greeted by International Street which lies just beyond the main entrance. As one of the park's original staples when it opened in 1972, International Street was designed by Bruce Bushman, a former Walt Disney Imagineering layout design artist. The area's architecture and cultural themes represent Italy, Spain, Germany and Switzerland. To save on the cost of construction, the second story of each building was designed on a three-quarters scale, borrowing from a practice used by Disney throughout its theme parks.

The area's main attractions include the Royal Fountain, a  capable of shooting  of water into the air each minute, and the signature Eiffel Tower, a one-third scale replica of the original which offers a view of the entire park to its guests. Grand Carousel, a classic carousel built in 1926 and originally located at Coney Island, is another International Street attraction. Also located here is the Kings Island Theater and a variety of restaurants and souvenir shops.

Oktoberfest
Oktoberfest, relating to the eponymous German festival, opened with the park in 1972. The area resembles a German town with timber-framed, German-style architecture. The Festhaus building is its central attraction, featuring live shows with several indoor eateries. Nearby is an outdoor bar that serves alcoholic beverages, with a portion of its seating area located above water bordering Oktoberfest lake. Rides within Oktoberfest include a mine train roller coaster called Adventure Express, which opened in 1991, and a swinging pirate ship ride called Viking Fury, which opened in 1982.

For 2023, Kings Island plans to replace Oktoberfest with Adventure Port, a newly-themed area expanded to add two new family rides, Sol Spin and Cargo Loco. Adventure Express will receive theming enhancements, and food venues will be renovated and renamed.

Planet Snoopy

The area initially opened with the park in 1972 as The Happy Land of Hanna-Barbera and was later shortened to Hanna-Barbera Land. One of the area's flagship attractions was a junior wooden roller coaster named Scooby Doo, which like The Racer was designed by John C. Allen but intended for younger riders. Enchanted Voyage, an Old Mill dark ride that ferried guests in unaccompanied boats along water-filled guideways, was also a primary attraction that opened with the park. Shaped like a large TV set, the building housed separately-themed areas that made heavy use of animatronic Hanna-Barbera characters. The ride was overhauled for the 1984 season when it became Smurf's Enchanted Voyage. In 1992, the building was transformed once more into Phantom Theater, replacing the ride's waterways with an Omnimover-style system of transport. It was themed as a behind-the-scenes tour of a haunted theater. The theme and ride vehicles would see additional changes over the years – Scooby Doo and the Haunted Castle in 2003 and Boo Blasters on Boo Hill in 2010 – but the same underlying transportation system was retained each time.

The portion of the area that borders Rivertown was revamped in 1995 with the addition of a kids' play area, stage and water attraction, and the new sub-section was named Nickelodeon Splat City. In 2001, the log ride Kings Mills Log Flume was updated with a children's theme and renamed The Wild Thornberrys River Adventure. The Rugrats Runaway Reptar inverted roller coaster was introduced the same year. This expansion into an area that was originally part of Rivertown became known as Nickelodeon Central. Hanna-Barbera Land was gradually converted over the next several years and eventually renamed "Nickelodeon Universe" in 2006.

Following Cedar Fair's purchase of the park from Paramount in 2006, Nickelodeon-themed elements were eventually removed and replaced with Peanuts comic strip themes in 2010 – the children's brand marketed at other Cedar Fair parks. Nickelodeon Universe became known as Planet Snoopy. The area features many rides intended for smaller children, as well as three family-oriented roller coasters and a skater coaster. Amusement Today awarded Kings Island with the Golden Ticket Award for "Best Kids' Area in the World" for eighteen consecutive years (2001–2018). Kings Island's Planet Snoopy was also the largest in the Cedar Fair chain until 2013, when Kings Dominion doubled the size of its Planet Snoopy section.

Rivertown
Rivertown is an area within the park that features a western theme depicting a town with ranch-style buildings, old wooden signs, and one of the park's most iconic attractions, the Kings Island & Miami Valley Railroad. Originally intended to be named Frontier Land, the area was eventually named Rivertown when it debuted with the park in 1972. The area included attractions such as Kings Mill Log Flume and Shawnee Landing, a canoe ride in a part of Rivertown known as Kenton's Cove.

Throughout the 1970s, Rivertown saw the addition of several attractions including Kenton's Cove Keelboat Canal in 1973, which was an elevated log flume ride that operated through the 2000 season, and The Beast roller coaster in 1979. Designed internally by Kings Island, The Beast opened as the tallest, fastest, and longest roller coaster in the world, and in addition to retaining its record length, it remains one of the most popular wooden roller coasters in the annual Golden Ticket Awards from Amusement Today. Other rides added over the years include a river rafting ride called White Water Canyon, which opened in 1985, and a heavily themed, indoor flat ride called Tomb Raider: The Ride (later renamed The Crypt), which opened in place of Kenton's Cove Keelboat Canal in 2002. The Crypt closed permanently in 2011.

In 2005, one of the last Paramount-themed attractions to open at the park, The Italian Job: Stunt Track (now known as Backlot Stunt Coaster), was unveiled. The roller coaster replaced the antique car ride Les Taxis and Ohio Overland Auto Livery.

In 2009, the park's first roller coaster from Bolliger & Mabillard, called Diamondback, opened in Rivertown. In August 2016, Kings Island revealed plans to build Mystic Timbers, a  wooden roller coaster that opened in 2017.

Soak City

Included with park admission, Soak City is a  water park featuring two wave pools, several children's areas and a variety of water slides. It originally opened in 1989 as WaterWorks and has since been expanded several times. It was renamed in 2004 to Crocodile Dundee's Boomerang Bay, based on the titular character from the film "Crocodile" Dundee, played by Paul Hogan who was also hired to promote the revamped water park. Following Cedar Fair's acquisition of Kings Island, it was later renamed Boomerang Bay, and all references to the film character were removed. On September 2, 2011, Kings Island announced a $10-million expansion of the water park for the 2012 season, as well as a plan to rename it Soak City. Tropical Plunge, a seven-story water slide complex, was added for the 2016 season.

Seasonal events

Halloween Haunt

Halloween Haunt is a Halloween-themed event at Kings Island that operates on weekends from September through October. It features haunted houses, mazes, live shows, and most of the park's regular season attractions. Special lighting and fog effects are utilized throughout the park, and actors in costume engage with guests. The event originally debuted as FearFest in 2000, and the name was later changed to Halloween Haunt in 2007.

Winterfest
Winterfest is an annual Christmas-themed holiday festival that operates from mid-November through late December, featuring ice skating on the Royal Fountain as well as the special lighting throughout the park. Some rides and attractions are in operation, and International Street is transformed into a winter village filled with Christmas carolers, homemade crafts, and holiday-themed refreshments and snacks. The event debuted in 1982 and returned annually through 1992, followed by a brief return in 2005. Under Cedar Fair's ownership, the park listened to guest feedback and brought Winterfest back in 2017. They planned several years in advance to increase the scale of the event, which showcases over 5 million color-changing lights and dozens of live performances each night.

Fast Lane

Fast Lane, introduced at Kings Island in July 2011, is a secondary queue system that offers shorter wait times on the park's most popular rides. In addition to the standard admission charge, visitors can bypass the standard wait line by purchasing a wrist band that grants access to the Fast Lane queue. A limited number of wrist bands are sold each day. Kings Island offers Fright Lane passes that operate the same way as Fast Lane but are for Halloween Haunt attractions only.

Significant facts

Notable changes and additions
 1977: Screamin' Demon debuts as one of the first forward- and backward-looping roller coasters in the United States.
 1979: Kings Island unveils The Beast, the world's tallest, fastest, and longest roller coaster.
 1981: The Bat opens as the first modern-day suspended roller coaster in the world.
 1982: An annual Christmas event called Winterfest debuts, which operates from late-November through December.
 1984: King Cobra opened as the first roller coaster designed from inception as a stand-up coaster. Plagued with mechanical problems and downtime, The Bat is removed.
 1987: Vortex is added to the park's coaster lineup, briefly holding a world record for its six inversions.
 1989: WaterWorks debuts as a family water park included with the price of admission, featuring a wave pool, water slides and other attractions.
 1999: The Adventure Village area begins the first of a two-year expansion, renamed Paramount Action Zone and rethemed as a movie studio backlot. Two new rides – FACE/OFF and Drop Zone: Stunt Tower – open in the new area, with the latter setting a record for the world's tallest gyro drop.
 2000: In the second year of expansion, Son of Beast opens in Action Zone as the world's tallest, fastest, and only-looping wooden roller coaster. Billed as a sequel to Kings Island's The Beast, it was also the park's first hypercoaster. A Halloween-themed evening event called FearFest, later renamed Halloween Haunt, debuts in October and begins operating annually at the park every fall season.
 2002: Tomb Raider: The Ride opens as the first Giant Top Spin from HUSS Park Attractions, which operated indoor and featured special effects themed to the film it was based on. King Cobra is dismantled after downtime and maintenance proved cost prohibitive.
 2007: Firehawk, a flying roller coaster relocated from Geauga Lake, opens in the X-Base area adjacent to Flight of Fear.
 2009: The first roller coaster from Bolliger & Mabillard at Kings Island, Diamondback, opens to the public. Son of Beast abruptly closes in June and remains closed indefinitely.
 2010: Planet Snoopy replaces Nickelodeon Universe. All Nickelodeon and Hanna-Barbera theming is removed, marking the first time in park history without an attraction themed to Scooby-Doo. 
 2011: A tower swing ride named WindSeeker opens at the end of the Coney Mall. Fast Lane is introduced for the first time, and Dinosaurs Alive! opens.
 2012: Boomerang Bay is renamed Soak City, which receives a moderate makeover. Son of Beast is demolished.
 2014: The longest inverted roller coaster in the world, Banshee, opens on the former location of both Son of Beast and Thunder Alley.
 2017: A new wooden coaster from Great Coasters International called Mystic Timbers makes its debut. Winterfest also returns after a twelve-year hiatus.
 2020: Orion is added as the park's first giga coaster, featuring a  drop.
 2023: Adventure Port is added as the park's newest area replacing Oktoberfest.

Notable events
1972: Hanna-Barbera produced an animated made-for-television film called The Banana Splits in Hocus Pocus Park, which mixed in live-action sequences filmed at Kings Island, and it aired on ABC in 1972.
1972: ABC sitcom The Partridge Family filmed at the park in the episode "I Left My Heart in Cincinnati", which aired on January 26, 1973.
1973: ABC sitcom The Brady Bunch filmed at the park in the episode "The Cincinnati Kids", which aired on November 23, 1973.
May 24, 2008: Robbie Knievel, son of Evel, successfully jumped over 24 Coke Zero trucks in the Kings Island Parking Lot. This was expected to be the last of Robbie's big jumps.
August 31, 2008: Barry Williams, Susan Olsen and Mike Lookinland returned to Kings Island for A Very Brady Reunion, a four-show special of song, dance and Brady Bunch stories.
Although it didn't break any world records, it was the highest skywalk Nik had completed to date and was three times higher than the skywalk Rick Wallenda performed a year earlier.
May 19, 2013: Former Brady Bunch stars Barry Williams, Susan Olsen and Christopher Knight returned to the park to "entertain park guests during four shows of singing, dancing and Brady Bunch anecdotes".

Notable people
The following is a list of former employees at Kings Island that later became well known in another industry:
 Curtis Cregan (actor) – worked as a live shows performer and emcee for the Nickelodeon show at Kings Island
 Carmen Electra (singer) – started her professional career in 1990 as a dancer at Kings Island in the show “It’s Magic”
 Woody Harrelson (actor) – wood carver at Kings Island during high school
 Justin Jeffre (singer) – part of quartet that performed throughout the park
 Lewis Johnson (reporter) – former rides supervisor on the Beast and Racer roller coasters at Kings Island (1981–87)
 Nick Lachey (singer) – part of quartet that performed throughout the park
 Dan Patrick (TV/radio sports host) – worked on park's golf course grounds crew
 Susan Perkins (1978 Miss America) – worked at the park as a live shows performer
 Gigi Rice (actress)
 Doug Jones (actor)

Other notable facilities

Dogstreet Cemetery
Dogstreet Cemetery is located at the north end of the Kings Island parking lot and is maintained by Deerfield Township. The historic cemetery dates back to 1803. The Warren County Genealogical Society documented nearly 70 grave sites in the cemetery, though , only 52 headstones remained.

On January 11, 2012, the amusement park and cemetery were featured on season 8, episode 1 of Ghost Hunters entitled Roller Ghoster. The show investigated claims of haunted occurrences inside the park and around the cemetery, particularly of a ghost reportedly known as "Missouri Jane." Warren County Genealogical Society records document a grave for a Missouri Jane Galeenor, who died in 1846 at age five.

Kings Island resort
As part of the Kings Island resort, in 1972 Taft Broadcasting Company built a golf course, hotel and campground.
 The Golf Center at Kings Island - Designed by Jack Nicklaus with Desmond Muirhead, the 18-hole "Grizzly" and the 9-hole "Bruin" golf courses are located just across Interstate 71. The "Grizzly" was used for PGA and LPGA tournaments throughout the years. The Kings Island golf courses were formerly known as the Jack Nicklaus Golf Center, Jack Nicklaus Sports Center and The Jack Nicklaus Golden Bear Golf Courses.
 Kings Island Inn - Designed to depict a small alpine village, the 300-room inn, also known as Kings Island Resort & Conference Center was located on Kings Island Drive across the street from the park. It featured a restaurant, indoor and outdoor pools, tennis court, sand volleyball, half-court basketball and a conference center. The inn was also featured in the Partridge Family's episode "I Left My Heart in Cincinnati" and the Brady Bunch episode "The Cincinnati Kids". The inn and conference center closed in 2014.
 Kings Island Campground - A 45-acre campground that opened with the park. It featured rental cabins, RV pull-through sites with hookups, tent sites, shower house, general store, playground and swimming pool. In the 1990s it was sold to a private operator, and for several years operated as a Jellystone branded campround. It closed in 2004. A large portion of the land was sold to Great Wolf Resorts, to develop a Great Wolf Lodge in partnership with Kings Island. The resort hotel cost approximately $100 million to construct.
Camp Cedar - This is a 52-acre resort that is less than a mile away from the park, and is a hybrid of a resort and a camping destination. It features 173 cottages and 164 RV spaces, and opened on June 14, 2021. It was operated by the park from June 2021 to February 2023.

Kings Island greenhouse
The park has its own greenhouse just off of Columbia Road. It can be seen from the top of The Bat's lift hill. It produces the flowers and topiary for the park. Some of their notable work is the "Living Liberty Bell" topiary and working "Flower Clock" near the Eiffel Tower.

Awards and recognition
 Best Kids' Area (2001–2018) – Golden Ticket Award from Amusement Today
 Best New Attraction (Diamondback) – NAPHA Award in 2009
 Publisher’s Pick: Park of the Year (2022) — Golden Ticket Award from Amusement Today
 Renaissance Award (2019)– Golden Ticket Award from Amusement Today
 Best New Ride(Mystic Timbers)-– Golden Ticket Award from Amusement Today in 2017
 Best Concert Venue(2006)– Golden Ticket Award from Amusement Today
 Best Amusement Park Halloween Event in USA(2021)- USA Today
 Best New Amusement Park Attraction(2020)(Mystic Timbers)-USA TODAY10Best National Readers' Poll

Attendance

See also 
Incidents at Kings Island

Notes

References

External links

 
 

 
1972 establishments in Ohio
Amusement parks in Ohio
Cedar Fair amusement parks
Buildings and structures in Warren County, Ohio
Tourist attractions in Warren County, Ohio
Amusement parks opened in 1972
Mason, Ohio